is a Japanese former sailor, who specialized in both Europe and Laser Radial classes. She captured a silver medal in her respective single-handed boat category at the 2002 Asian Games in Busan, South Korea, and was also selected to compete for Japan in two editions of the Olympic Games (2000 and 2004).

Sato made her Olympic debut in Sydney 2000, where she finished twenty-third in the Europe class with a satisfying net grade of 172, surpassing Belarusian sailor Tatiana Drozdovskaya by a close, four-point margin.

When South Korea hosted the 2002 Asian Games, Sato sailed away vigorously towards a silver-medal finish in the Europe class with a grade of 16 points, an exact double of the score attained by her Chinese rival and eventual champion Lu Chunfeng.

At the 2004 Summer Olympics in Athens, Sato qualified for her second Japanese team in the Europe class by virtue of her status as the country's top sailor in her respective category, placing among the top 30 from the Semaine Olympique Francaise nearly three months earlier in Hyères, France. As her previous Games, Sato could not be able to improve her Olympic feat with mediocre marks recorded throughout the eleven-race series, sitting her in twenty-fourth position with 192 net points. Furthermore, Sato's overall score spared her from the far bottom of the leaderboard by a twelve-point edge over the Russian rookie Natalia Ivanova.

References

External links
 
 
 
 Japanese Olympic Team Profile 

1978 births
Living people
Japanese female sailors (sport)
Olympic sailors of Japan
Sailors at the 2000 Summer Olympics – Europe
Sailors at the 2004 Summer Olympics – Europe
Asian Games medalists in sailing
Asian Games silver medalists for Japan
Sailors at the 2002 Asian Games
Medalists at the 2002 Asian Games
Sportspeople from Yamaguchi Prefecture